The 1902 Lake Forest Foresters football team was an American football team that represented Lake Forest University in the 1902 college football season.

Schedule

References

Lake Forest
Lake Forest Foresters football seasons
Lake Forest Foresters football